Artan Mërgjyshi (born 6 May 1968) is an Albanian professional football coach and former player.

During his playing career, he enjoyed his best years with Partizani, while also having stints with Dinamo Tirana, Erzeni, Besa and Apolonia. He has been a former Albanian international, making one senior appearance in 1996.

International career
Mërgjyshi has only one cap with Albania. He played his first and only match with Red and Blacks on 24 April 1996 against the newest national team of Bosnia and Herzegovina, playing full-90 minutes in a goalless draw.

Management career
In January 2015, Mërgjyshi was appointed as manager of struggling Apolonia with the only goal to avoid the team's relegation in Kategoria e Parë. Apolonia, however, was relegated one division lower after losing 1–0 at Niko Dovana Stadium against the survival rivals of Teuta in the penultimate week of the 2014–15 season.

On 7 August 2018, Mërgjyshi was named the new manager of Laçi, replacing Besnik Prenga. In December 2018 he was replaced by Migen Memelli. In the summer of 2019 he was reappointed manager of Apolonia.

Honours

Clubs
Partizani=

Albanian Cup: 1996–97

References

External links

1968 births
Living people
Footballers from Tirana
Albanian footballers
Association football defenders
Albania international footballers
KF Korabi Peshkopi players
FK Partizani Tirana players
FK Dinamo Tirana players
KF Erzeni players
Besa Kavajë players
KF Apolonia Fier players
Albanian football managers
FK Dinamo Tirana managers
KS Kastrioti managers
Besa Kavajë managers
KF Apolonia Fier managers
KF Korabi Peshkopi managers
KF Bylis Ballsh managers
KF Laçi managers
Kategoria Superiore managers
Kategoria e Parë managers